is a Japanese actress, tarento and singer. She is represented with Box Corporation. She is the president of the non-profit organization Aqua Planet. She is also the associated president of the Japan Sap Yoga and detoxification in Okinawa.

Filmography

TV dramas

Films

Variety, information programmes

Internet dramas

Advertisements

Discography

Singles

Albums

Best albums

Bibliography

Photo albums

Photo essays

References

External links
 
 

Japanese actresses
Japanese television personalities
People from Tokyo
1971 births
Living people